Tuxoctenus is a genus of spiders in the family Miturgidae. It was first described in 2008 by Raven. , it contains 3 Australian species.

References

Miturgidae
Araneomorphae genera
Spiders of Australia